The 1974/75 NTFL season was the 54th season of the Northern Territory Football League (NTFL). But the season was cancelled after round 11 due to Cyclone Tracy.

After when the season was abandoned, Nightcliff were award as the minor primers when they finished on top at that point when cancelled.

References 

Northern Territory Football League seasons
NTFL